The Cohens and Kellys in Hollywood is a 1932 American pre-Code comedy film directed by John Francis Dillon and written by Howard J. Green. The film stars George Sidney, Charles Murray, June Clyde, Norman Foster, Esther Howard, and Emma Dunn. The film was released on March 28, 1932, by Universal Pictures.

Cast 
George Sidney as Sidney Nathan Cohen
Charles Murray as Michael Kelly
June Clyde as Kitty Kelly
Norman Foster as Maurice Cohen
Esther Howard as Mrs. Maggie Kelly
Emma Dunn as Mrs. Sarah Cohen
Eileen Percy as Eileen Percy
Edwin Maxwell as Chauncey Chadwick
Luis Alberni as Bladimir Petrosky
John Roche as Gregory Gordon
Robert Greig as Chesterfield
Dorothy Christy as Mrs. Chauncey Chadwick
Harry Barris as Pianist
Frank Albertson as Frank Albertson
Lew Ayres as Lew Ayers
Sidney Fox as Sidney Fox
Genevieve Tobin as Genevieve Tobin
Tom Mix as Tom Mix

References

External links
 

1932 films
American comedy films
1932 comedy films
Universal Pictures films
Films directed by John Francis Dillon
American black-and-white films
1930s English-language films
1930s American films